Sturmiopsis is a genus of flies in the family Tachinidae.

Species
S. angustifrons Mesnil, 1959
S. inferens Townsend, 1916
S. parasitica (Curran, 1939)

References

Diptera of Africa
Diptera of Asia
Exoristinae
Tachinidae genera
Taxa named by Charles Henry Tyler Townsend